"Corde della mia chitarra" ("Strings of my guitar") is an Italian song written by , composed by , and performed by Nunzio Gallo and Claudio Villa. Both original recordings of the song are ranked among the top 100 most successful songs in Italy in 1957.

Lyrics and melody 
With live guitar accompaniment provided by Piero Gozo for Nunzio Gallo's version as seen in the Eurovision contest, and with a vocal ranging between light and classical opera styles, the song is a ballad in the chanson style as well as the opera tones popular in Italy and Europe in the 1950s. Gallo sings of his mixed feelings at seeing a former lover and realising that she is no longer interested in him. He asks the strings of his guitar to play for him alone, since she has no interest in their music anymore.

Eurovision Song Contest 
The song is the longest in the contest's history. Writer John Kennedy O'Connor describes it as "over five minutes long" in his work on the contest, and Des Mangan records it as "5 minutes and 9 seconds", as well as suggesting that the listener "would have thought of many better uses for the strings of his guitar". Following this contest, the rule governing the length of entries was tightened to require them to be no longer than 3.5 minutes initially and later 3 minutes exactly, with both authors agreeing that the change was due to this entry's length. In the 2007 edition of John Kennedy O'Connor's The Eurovision Song Contest – The Official History, the song is officially listed as the longest entry in the history of the contest, and was performed after the song which, until 2015, was the officially listed shortest song.

The song was performed fourth on the night, following the 's Patricia Bredin with "All" and preceding 's Bob Martin with "Wohin, kleines Pony?". At the close of voting, it had received 7 points, placing it sixth in a field of ten. It was succeeded as Italian representative at the 1958 contest by Domenico Modugno with "Nel blu dipinto di blu".

Charts 
According to the data calculated at "Hit Parade Italia" which presents weekly and top 100 yearly positions for a mix of both Italian and international songs, the version by Nunzio Gallo is ranked #69 and the version by Claudio Villa the #38 most successful singles in Italy in 1957.

References

Sources 

Eurovision songs of 1957
Eurovision songs of Italy
Sanremo Music Festival songs
1957 songs